

People 
 Jorge Carrascosa, Argentine former footballer

Places 
 Carrascosa, Cuenca, a municipality in the province of Cuenca, Castile-La Mancha
 Carrascosa de Abajo, a municipality in the province of Soria, Castilla y León
 Carrascosa de Haro, a municipality in the province of Cuenca, Castilla-La Mancha
 Carrascosa de la Sierra, a municipality in the province of Soria, Castilla y León 
 Carrascosa del Campo, a town in the municipality of Campos del Paraíso, province of Cuenca, Castilla-La Mancha
 Sierra Carrascosa, in Aragon